The DC Comics Super Hero Collection was a fortnightly magazine collection,  by Eaglemoss Publications, and DC Comics, launched on the 15 March 2008, in the United Kingdom. The series was inspired by the success of The Classic Marvel Figurine Collection, also published by Eaglemoss. Each issue featured a hand painted, lead figure of a character from DC comic books, as well as an informational magazine, about the character. The collection consisted of two regular issues a month, with a special issue released every two months, to accommodate the larger characters in the DC Universe. The series also spawned a sub-series called "The Blackest Night/Brightest Day" collection, featuring characters from the various lantern corps from the DC Universe.

The magazine series officially ended on November 2012, with 120 issues in the main series, nineteen specials, and sixteen issues in The Blackest Night/Brightest Day sub series.

Regular issues
All issues are listed in the order of release from the website:
 Issue 1: Batman
 Issue 2: Superman
 Issue 3: The Joker
 Issue 4: Green Lantern (Hal Jordan)
 Issue 5: The Flash (Wally West)
 Issue 6: Robin (Tim Drake)
 Issue 7: Green Arrow
 Issue 8: Wonder Woman
 Issue 9: Catwoman
 Issue 10: Ra's al Ghul
 Issue 11: Lex Luthor
 Issue 12: Two-Face
 Issue 13: Scarecrow
 Issue 14: Supergirl (Kara Zor-El)
 Issue 15: Shazam
 Issue 16: Riddler
 Issue 17: Starfire
 Issue 18: Martian Manhunter
 Issue 19: Nightwing
 Issue 20: Booster Gold
 Issue 21: Raven
 Issue 22: Donna Troy
 Issue 23: Spectre
 Issue 24: Creeper
 Issue 25: Deadshot
 Issue 26: Penguin
 Issue 27: Deathstroke
 Issue 28: Sinestro
 Issue 29: Black Adam
 Issue 30: Captain Cold
 Issue 31: Aquaman
 Issue 32: Superboy Prime
 Issue 33: Hawkman
 Issue 34: Blue Beetle (Ted Kord)
 Issue 35: Bizarro
 Issue 36: Hitman
 Issue 37: Batgirl (Cassandra Cain)
 Issue 38: Guy Gardner
 Issue 39: Brother Blood
 Issue 40: Mary Marvel
 Issue 41: Golden Age Green Lantern (Alan Scott)
 Issue 42: Cyborg Superman
 Issue 43: Poison Ivy
 Issue 44: Doctor Light (Arthur Light)
 Issue 45: Harley Quinn
 Issue 46: Firestorm (Ronnie Raymond)
 Issue 47: Cyborg
 Issue 48: Red Tornado
 Issue 49: Beast Boy
 Issue 50: Huntress
 Issue 51: The Atom (Ray Palmer)
 Issue 52: Golden Age Flash (Jay Garrick)
 Issue 53: Red Robin
 Issue 54: Black Canary
 Issue 55: John Stewart
 Issue 56: Mister Miracle (Scott Free)
 Issue 57: Zatanna
 Issue 58: Mr. Freeze
 Issue 59: Metamorpho
 Issue 60: Dr. Fate (Hector Hall)
 Issue 61: Adam Strange
 Issue 62: Red Arrow
 Issue 63: Hawkgirl
 Issue 64: The Question (Vic Sage)
 Issue 65: Brainiac
 Issue 66: Black Lightning
 Issue 67: Cosmic Boy
 Issue 68: Captain Atom
 Issue 69: Detective Chimp
 Issue 70: Power Girl
 Issue 71: Lightning Lad
 Issue 72: Plastic Man
 Issue 73: Wildcat (Ted Grant)
 Issue 74: Deadman
 Issue 75: Steel
 Issue 76: Big Barda
 Issue 77: Azrael (Jean Paul Valley)
 Issue 78: Saturn Girl
 Issue 79: Orion
 Issue 80: Mister Terrific (Michael Holt)
 Issue 81: Batwoman
 Issue 82: Dr. Mid-Nite (Charles McNider)
 Issue 83: Kyle Rayner
 Issue 84: Professor Zoom
 Issue 85: Black Manta
 Issue 86: Magog
 Issue 87: Ambush Bug
 Issue 88: Starman (Jack Knight)
 Issue 89: Hush
 Issue 90: Blue Devil
 Issue 91: Brainiac 5
 Issue 92: Blue Beetle (Jaime Reyes)
 Issue 93: Captain Boomerang (Digger Harkness)
 Issue 94: Hourman (Rick Tyler)
 Issue 95: Batgirl (Barbara Gordon)
 Issue 96: Phantom Stranger
 Issue 97: Cheetah (Barbara Ann Minerva)
 Issue 98: Animal Man
 Issue 99: Superboy (Kon-El)
 Issue 100: Ravager (Rose Wilson)
 Issue 101: Mon-El
 Issue 102: Static
 Issue 103: Mirror Master (Evan McCulloch)
 Issue 104: Mad Hatter
 Issue 105: Elasti-Girl with Bumblebee
 Issue 106: Stargirl
 Issue 107: Gold
 Issue 108: Mera
 Issue 109: Robotman (Cliff Steele)
 Issue 110: Grifter
 Issue 111: Aqualad (Jackson Hyde)
 Issue 112: Jason Todd
 Issue 113: Metallo
 Issue 114: Vixen
 Issue 115: John Constantine
 Issue 116: Negative Man
 Issue 117: Wonder Girl (Cassie Sandsmark)
 Issue 118: Ventriloquist (Arnold Wesker) w/ Scarface
 Issue 119: Elongated Man
 Issue 120: Kid Flash

Special issues
These are the specials that have been released.
 Special exclusive: Superman and the Daily Planet (released only in Brazil)
 Subscriber exclusive: Batman on the roof
 Special issue 1: Darkseid
 Special issue 2: Doomsday
 Special issue 3: Bane
 Special issue 4: Killer Croc
 Special issue 5: The Anti-Monitor
 Special issue 6: Gorilla Grodd
 Special issue 7: Batman and the Batcycle
 Special issue 8: Solomon Grundy
 Special issue 9: Centennial Park Superman
 Special issue 10: Etrigan the Demon
 Special issue 11: Lobo
 Special issue 12: Jonah Hex
 Special issue 13: Kilowog
 Special issue 14: Trigon
 Special issue 15: Man-Bat
 Special issue 16: Bat-Mite & Mister Mxyzptlk (on a shared base)
 Special issue 17: Clayface
 Special issue 18: Swamp Thing
 Special issue 19: Giganta

Blackest Night/Brightest Day
In January 2011, Eaglemoss started releasing a subset based on the acclaimed Blackest Night and Brightest Day storylines. The size and base of the figurines is the same as the regular figurines while the DC Comics logo on the base is replaced by the various Corps logos.
 Issue 1: Black Hand
 Issue 2: Atrocitus
 Issue 3: Larfleeze
 Issue 4: Saint Walker
 Issue 5: Star Sapphire (Carol Ferris)
 Issue 6: Parallax infested Hal Jordan
 Issue 7: Indigo-1
 Issue 8: White Lantern Sinestro
 Issue 9: Ganthet
 Issue 10: Bleez
 Issue 11: Deathstorm
 Issue 12: Jade
 Issue 13: Hawk (Hank Hall)
 Issue 14: Dove (Dawn Granger)
 Issue 15: Lyssa Drak
 Issue 16: Arisia Rrab
 Special: Nekron

Awards
The DC Super-Hero Figurine Collection won the "Magazine of the Year" award in the Diamond Gem Award 2009, 2010 & 2011.

See also
 The Classic Marvel Figurine Collection

References

DC Comics titles
DC Comics action figure lines